Academy Park High School is a four-year public high school in Sharon Hill, Pennsylvania. It is currently the only high school in the Southeast Delco School District.

Academy Park High School formed in fall 1982 and its building opened fall 1984. In the interim, the old Collingdale and Sharon Hill high schools were used as an east and west campus for the new school. The former Darby Township High School was converted into Ashland Middle School. Portions of the old Collingdale High School still stand, serving as the town’s borough hall and a municipal court, while the old Sharon Hill High School was demolished. Though the building is gone, the school’s former football field serves as home to the Academy Park Knights.

Academy Park’s first principal, Agnes M. Paterson, was an active supporter of the school’s activities and students. She died unexpectedly in spring 1987 after attending a performance of the school district’s annual spring musical. The school’s auditorium has been named in her honor.

References

External links
 Academy Park High School (from the Southeast Delco School District website)
 Cheney schedules debate practice (this article mentions Dick Cheney's visit to the school in 2000)

Public high schools in Pennsylvania
Educational institutions established in 1982
Schools in Delaware County, Pennsylvania
1982 establishments in Pennsylvania